
Mews was a restaurant in Baltimore, County Cork, Ireland. It was awarded a Michelin star in 2019.

Mews  (sometimes called The Mews) was opened in a former coachhouse by Robert Collender and James Ellis in 2015. Mews Restaurant was founded on the principle of exploring Irish cuisine through the ingredients of West Cork; Ahmet Dede was the Head Chef. All ingredients was sourced locally in the West Cork region.

Mews closed in January 2020, with head chef Ahmet Dede moving on to a new restaurant, Dede.

Awards
 Michelin star: 2019, 2020

See also
List of Michelin starred restaurants in Ireland

References

External links

Baltimore, County Cork
Culture in County Cork
Michelin Guide starred restaurants in Ireland
2015 establishments in Ireland
2020 disestablishments in Ireland